Sergey Evgenievich Mokritskiy (born February 18, 1961)  is a Russian film director and cinematographer of Ukrainian origin.

Filmography

As director
 The Four Ages of Love (2008)
 Cherchill (2009)
 Teacher's Day (2012)
 Battle for Sevastopol (2015)
 I Am a Teacher (2016)
 A Rough Draft (2018)

As cinematographer
 The Smell of Autumn (1993)
 All the Things We Dreamt of for So Long (1997)
 Killer's Diary (2003)
 Parallel Voices (2005)
 Shift (2006)
 Playing the Victim (2006)
 Anna German. Echo of Love (2011)
 My Dad Baryshnikov (2011)
 Afganistan. Point of no Return (2012)
 Without Witnesses (2012)
 Sex, Coffee, Cigarettes (2014)
 I Am a Teacher (2016)

As scriptwriter 
 Teacher's Day (2012)
 Battle for Sevastopol (2015)
 A Rough Draft (2018)

References

External links

1961 births
Living people
Russian film directors
Russian cinematographers
Russian screenwriters
Gerasimov Institute of Cinematography alumni